This is a chronological list of feudal lords of Međimurje, a small historical and geographical region in northernmost part of Croatia, from the 13th century to 1923.

Feudal lords of Međimurje from 13th century to 1540
 Buzad-Hahold family (c.1200 - c.1270?)
 Period of feudal wars (c.1270 - c.1300)
 Ulric of Walsee (c.1300 - 1328)
 King Charles I Robert (1328 - 1342)
 King Louis the Angevin (1342 - 1350)
 Lacković (1350 - 1397)
 Szécsényi (1397 - 1404)
 Celjski (1405 - 1461)
 King Matija Korvin (1461 - 1464)
 Fridrik Lamberg (1464 - 1473)
 Ernušt (1473-1540)

Feudal lords of Međimurje in the modern era (1540 - 1923)
 Petar Keglević (1540 - 1546)
 Zrinski (1546 - 1691)
 Hungarian Chamber (1691 - 1694) 
 marquess Turinetti de Prye (1694 - 1702)
 King Charles III of Habsburg (1702 - 1715)
 Ivan Čikulin (1715 - 1719)
 Althann (1719 - 1791)
 Feštetić (1791 - 1923)

See also
 List of prefects of Međimurje County
 List of noble families of Croatia
 Međimurje County Museum

References

Timeline of feudal lords of Međimurje

 
Croatian timelines
Lists of people by city in Croatia
Croatia history-related lists